Carter Nicholas Oosterhouse (born September 19, 1976) is an American television personality and former model, who was born in Traverse City, Michigan. Oosterhouse first gained national fame as a carpenter on the TLC series Trading Spaces and has hosted other home improvement and how-to television shows. In 2008, he was host of three HGTV network shows: Carter Can, Red Hot & Green, and Million Dollar Rooms.

Early life
Oosterhouse's career as a carpenter began at the age of 10, when he began learning carpentry as an apprentice to his neighbor, a carpenter. He continued to work in carpentry and construction throughout school following in the footsteps of his older brothers, Todd and Tyler, who are also carpenters. For his formal education, he attended the Grand Traverse Area Catholic Schools. Oosterhouse has a B.A. in nutrition and communication from Central Michigan University.

Early career
After college, Oosterhouse relocated to Los Angeles to pursue a career in film and television. In LA, he worked behind-the-scenes for the Project Greenlight as a production assistant and tape coordinator.

When auditioning for a new show on TLC, Oosterhouse landed a part on the show Trading Spaces, and joined the cast in their fourth season.

Television shows and appearances
In 2003, Oosterhouse joined TLC's series Trading Spaces in its fourth season. In that same year, TLC also added the spin-offs Trading Spaces: Family and Trading Spaces: Boys v. Girls to their programs, which allowed Oosterhouse the opportunity to work with children.

In 2004, Oosterhouse did an episode of CBS Sunday Morning in New York in which he remodeled correspondent Bill Geist's office with the help of commentator Andy Rooney.

In 2005, Oosterhouse was a contributor to NBC's show Three Wishes, a primetime unscripted series with Amy Grant, in which Oosterhouse visited small towns across America to help wishes come true.

Oosterhouse has been featured as an expert for such programs as Rachael Ray, The Today Show, The CBS Early Show, The Oprah Winfrey Show, The View, CNN, Entertainment Tonight and Extra.

In fall 2007, Oosterhouse launched two new shows, Carter Can, a home improvement show premiering on HGTV, and The Inside Job, a behind-the-scenes view of Carter Can, on the DIY Network.

In early 2008, a second show was added on the HGTV network, Red Hot & Green, with Nicole Facciuto, on which Oosterhouse promotes eco-friendly materials for earth-friendly living.

Oosterhouse was the host of the 2012 HGTV network show Million Dollar Rooms, showcasing extravagant features of elaborately built homes.

In 2015, Oosterhouse began hosting the ABC reality show The Great Christmas Light Fight with Taniya Nayak. He returned for subsequent holiday seasons in 2016 through 2022.

Print
Oosterhouse has been named one of People magazine's "Sexiest man on TV" in its "Sexiest Man Alive" issue. He was also named one of the sexiest men on television by TV Guide Channel, Inside TV magazine, and CosmoGirl.

He has also been featured in US Weekly, OK Weekly, USA Today, the Los Angeles Times, Chicago Tribune, Redbook, Good Housekeeping, Everyday with Rachael Ray and LA Confidential among other publications.

Modelling
Oosterhouse is the face of the men's fragrance Voyage by Nautica.

In the past, Oosterhouse has modeled in print campaigns for Nivea, Lincoln, Hewlett Packard, and Miller Light. In addition, he has also appeared in television advertisements for Bud Light, Lake Michigan Credit Union, Nivea, Treasure Island in Las Vegas, Gillette's M3Power razor, and Rooms To Go.

Charitable works
Oosterhouse established Carter's Kids, a non-profit organization dedicated to creating and promoting awareness of fitness and self-esteem for America's youth. The purpose is to increase the activity level of kids by building and developing community parks and playgrounds in their neighborhoods. The kids then have the opportunity to take an active part in building up their community by using, sharing, and caring for these public spaces. In 2011, Carter's Kids partnered with Rebuilding Together to build six playgrounds promoting the health and welfare of children in low income communities.

Personal life
Oosterhouse married actress Amy Smart on September 10, 2011, in Traverse City, Michigan. They had their first child, Flora Oosterhouse, via surrogate on December 26, 2016.

In December 2017, a makeup artist on the Carter Can television show accused Oosterhouse of coercing her into performing sex acts in 2008. He acknowledged an "intimate relationship" and claimed this had been consensual, with the woman in question initiating such encounters on the first and several successive occasions. The woman's claims were not "confirmed or verified".

See also
 Eliminalia - removed critical stories for Oosterhouse

References

External links
Official website

WEB EXCLUSIVE: "Trading Spaces" hunk builds following Denver Post
6 things to know about Carter Oosterhouse Canadian Living

American television personalities
1976 births
Living people
Central Michigan University alumni
American people of Mexican descent
People from Traverse City, Michigan